WATA is a radio station in Boone, North Carolina, United States

WATA or Wata may also refer to:

 A. A. Bere Tallo Airport (ICAO code: WATA), an airport in Atambua, East Nusa Tenggara, Indonesia
 Mami Wata, a water spirit venerated in West, Central, and Southern Africa
 Wata Games, a grading authority in the field of video game collecting
 Williamsburg Area Transit Authority, a multi-jurisdiction transportation agency

People
 Anna van Gogh-Kaulbach (1869-1960; also Wata), Dutch writer and translator
 Eddy Wata (born 1976), Nigerian Eurodance artist
 Wata, member of the Japanese experimental music band Boris

See also
 L'Expression de Mamy-Wata (often Mamy-Wata), a weekly satirical newspaper published in Cameroon